Alishan Forest Railway Garage Park is a railway workshop of Alishan Forest Railway in East District, Chiayi City, Taiwan.

Exhibitions
The park consists of a garage and reparation facility. It displays various display of trains from steam locomotives, diesel locomotives, passenger cars and freight cars.

Transportation
The workshop is accessible within walking distance southwest of Beiman Station of Alishan Forest Railway.

See also
 Rail transport in Taiwan

References

Buildings and structures in Chiayi
East District, Chiayi
Railway workshops in Taiwan
Transportation in Chiayi